Neargyractis slossonalis, the dimorphic leafcutter moth, is a moth in the family Crambidae. It was described by Harrison Gray Dyar Jr. in 1906. It is found in Cuba and the south-eastern United States, where it has been recorded from Alabama, Florida, South Carolina, Georgia and Mississippi.

The wingspan is about 13 mm. Adults have been recorded on wing year round.

References

Acentropinae
Moths described in 1906